was a han school located in the Chōshū Domain of Japan. The school was one of the three major educational institutions in Japan, along with the Kōdōkan in Mito Domain and Shizutani School in Okayama Domain.

History 
The school was established in 1718 by the 6th Chōshū Domain daimyō Mōri Yoshimoto, located in the sannomaru (third bailey) of Hagi Castle, and covered an area of 940 tsubo (approx 3,102 square meters). It was later moved to the lower Hagi Castle area (part of current Hagi, Yamaguchi) by the 14th daimyō Mōri Takachika in accordance with han reforms, where it covered a total area of 15,184 tsubo (50,107 m²). 3,020 tsubo (9,966 m²) of the area were used as military training grounds. The han office was moved to Yamaguchi in 1863, and renamed Yamaguchi Kōdo, a school founded there by Hōyō Ueda, as Yamaguchi Meirinkan, creating two Meirikan schools located in Yamaguchi and Hagi.

Meiji Restoration intellects Yoshida Shōin and Takasugi Shinsaku were both students at the Meirinkan. Other distinguished graduates include Japanese Imperial Army officer Miura Gorō, diplomat Aoki Shūzō and Kido Takayoshi, Meiji Restoration hero and Meiji statesman.

Hagi Meirinkan 
 is currently part of Hagi City Meirin Elementary School, and its ruins were decreed a historic site by the Japanese government on December 7, 1919. Manga artist Yū Koyama's debut title,  is set in Hagi Meirinkan.

Yamaguchi Meirinkan 
 was moved to a large site called  in 1861, when the school was called Yamaguchi Kōshūdō. It was surrounded by a moat, located in central Yamaguchi City. The Kameyama Campus continued to serve as an educational facility for over 110 years as the current Yamaguchi University School of Business. The moat was filled in order to build a prefectural road after the school was merged into the Yoshida (Hirakawa) campus in 1973, but parts of the moat were later restored. The Yamaguchi Prefectural Museum of Art is located within the former campus grounds. Ōmura Masujirō served as an instructor for the Yamaguchi Meirinkan before the Chōshū civil wars.

References

External links 

Yamaguchi University 

Schools in Japan
Tourist attractions in Yamaguchi Prefecture
Buildings and structures in Yamaguchi Prefecture
Historic Sites of Japan